Norah Beare (born 25 May 1946, Banbridge, County Down) is a former Northern Irish unionist politician who served as a Member of the Northern Ireland Assembly (MLA) for Lagan Valley from 2003 to 2007.

She was elected as an Ulster Unionist Party (UUP) candidate in the Assembly election of 2003; however, she defected to the Democratic Unionist Party (DUP) in 2004 along with Jeffrey Donaldson MP, MLA for Lagan Valley and Arlene Foster, MLA for Fermanagh and South Tyrone.

Norah Beare worked for forty years as a secretary in a number of different companies and then became in 1997 the Personal Assistant to Jeffrey Donaldson. Beare was elected to the Banbridge, County Down council in 2001 as a UUP candidate. On Donaldson's advice she was selected as the third UUP candidate for the November 2003 Northern Ireland Assembly elections.

In December 2003 she resigned, with Donaldson and Arlene Foster, from the UUP and subsequently joined the DUP in January 2004. In 2005 she was re-elected to the council as a DUP politician. In January 2007, Beare was not selected by the Lagan Valley DUP association to fight the next Northern Ireland Assembly elections due in early March 2007.

Beare was elected chairman of  Banbridge District Council in 2008. She is DUP Party Spokesperson for Health and Social Services.

References

1946 births
Living people
Members of Banbridge District Council
Democratic Unionist Party councillors
Ulster Unionist Party councillors
People from Banbridge
Northern Ireland MLAs 2003–2007
Female members of the Northern Ireland Assembly
Ulster Unionist Party MLAs
Democratic Unionist Party MLAs
Women councillors in Northern Ireland